Cespedesia is a genus of flowering plants belonging to the family Ochnaceae.

Its native range is Central and Southern Tropical America.

Species:
 Cespedesia spathulata (Ruiz & Pav.) Planch.

References

Ochnaceae
Malpighiales genera